Margueritte is the surname of:

 Arnaud Margueritte (born 1973), French footballer
 Jean Auguste Margueritte (1823-1870), French general
 Paul Margueritte (1860-1918), Algerian-born French writer, son of the general
 Victor Margueritte (1866–1942), Algerian-born French writer, son of the general

See also
 Ève Paul-Margueritte (1885-1971), French novelist, translator; daughter of Paul Margueritte
 Lucie Paul-Margueritte (1886-1955), French writer, translator; daughter of Paul Margueritte
 Marguerite (disambiguation)